The Mañjuśrī-Nāma-Saṃgīti  (hereafter, Nama-samgiti) is considered amongst the most advanced teachings given by the Shakyamuni Buddha. It represents the pinnacle of all Shakyamuni Buddha's teachings, being a tantra of the nondual (advaya) class, along with the Kalachakra Tantra.

The Nama-samgiti was preached by Shakyamuni Buddha for his disciple Vajrapani and his wrathful retinue in order to lead them into buddhahood.  The essence of the Nama-samgiti is that Manjushri bodhisattva is the embodiment of all knowledge.  The Nama-samgiti is a short text, only circa 160 verses and a prose section.  It is a fraction of the vast Sutras such as Avatamsaka Sutra and Prajñāpāramitā Sutras or the endless ocean of tantras such as manjushri-mula-kalpa and the mountainous Hinayana teachings and sea of sundry extra-canonical works.  And yet, the Nama-samgiti contains all of the Buddha's dharmas. It summarizes everything he taught.  As Shakyamuni Buddha says of the Nama-samgiti, it is "the chief clarification of words".  It is the "nondual reality".  Therefore, all sentient beings should definitely study and recite the manjushri-nama-samgiti.

Alternative titles
"manjushrijnanasattvasya-paramartha-namasamgiti" (full Sanskrit title) lit. "The chanting of the names of Manjushri , the embodiment of supreme knowledge"
Āryamañjuśrīnāmasaṃgīti ཨཱརྱ་མཉྫུ་ཤྲཱི་ནཱ་མ་སཾ་གི་ཏི

See also
Tibetan Buddhist canon

Further reading
 Davidson, Ronald M. (1981) The Litany of Names of Manjushri - Text and Translation of the Manjushri-nama-samgiti, in Strickmann (ed.) Tantric and Taoist Studies (R.A. Stein Festschrift), Brussels: Institut Belge des Hautes Etudes Chinoises (Melanges Chinois et Bouddhiques, vol. XX-XXI) 1981
 Wayman, Alex (1985), Chanting the Names of Mañjuśrī: The Mañjuśrī-Nāma-Saṃgīti, Shambhala, 1985. [Reprint  Motilal Banarsidass Publishers. Delhi 2006. ]
Lāl, Banārasī (1986),  Āryamañjuśrī-nāma-saṃgīti:A Text-Analysis in Dhīḥ 1 1986 p. 220–238
Shakya, Min Bahadur (ed.)(2009),  Āryamañjuśrīnāmasaṅgīti: Sanskrit and Tibetan texts with their pronunciation, Lalitpur, Nagarjuna Institute of Exact Methods.

References

External links
A Concert of Names of Manjushri (Manjushri-namasamgiti) translated from the Tibetan, as clarified by the Sanskrit ~ Alexander Berzin, 2004
 Manjusrinamasamgiti - GRETIL Transliterated Sanskrit text based on the edition by Janardan Shastri Pandey in Bauddhastotrasamgraha
 Manjusrinamasamgiti - GRETIL Transliterated Sanskrit text based on: Davidson, R. M.: The Litany of Names of Manjusri.

Buddhist tantras
Mañjuśrī
Tibetan Buddhist practices